Yunlong is a town under the administration of Lu County in Luzhou, southeast Sichuan, China. , it administers Dakang Residential Community and the following 13 villages:
Zhanqi Village
Dashuihe Village
Gaojiazui Village
Maoba Village
Longhe Village
Yingxiong Village
Xianfeng Village
Longtanzi Village
Yunfeng Village
Yanggao Village
Fu'er Village
Getengwan Village
Zhumeitan Village

References 

Township-level divisions of Sichuan
Lu County